The following is a timeline of the history of the city of Haifa, Israel.

Prior to 20th century

 1047 – Persian traveler Nasir Khusraw visits village.
 1100 or 1101 – a Crusader fleet and land army conquer Haifa. The Crusaders rename it Caiphas.
 1187 – Saladin captures Haifa.
 1251 – Fortifications built by Louis IX of France (approximate date).
 1291 – Mamluk Al-Ashraf Khalil captures Haifa.
 1869 – German Colony established near town.
 1873 – Najib Effendi al-Yasin becomes mayor.
 1883 – Rushdi school opens.
 1887 – Haifa becomes part of the Ottoman Beirut Vilayet.
 1898 – Pier and Jaffa-Haifa roadway built.
 1900 - Population: estimate 12,000.

20th century

 1905 – Hejaz Railroad branch begins operating; train station built.
 1908 – Al-Karmil newspaper begins publication.
 1909 – Shrine of the Báb built on Mt. Carmel.
 1912 – Maccabi Haifa sport club formed.
 1913 – Hebrew Reali School and Maccabi Haifa Football Club established.
 1918 – 23 September: Haifa occupied by British forces.
 1921 – Haifa Chamber of Commerce and Industry established.
 1922 – Population: 24,600.
 1924
 Technion – Israel Institute of Technology opens.
 Hapoel Haifa Football Club formed.
 1928 – Stella Maris Light built.
 1931 – Population: 50,403.
 1933 – Port of Haifa expanded.
 1934 – Haifa Airport established.
 1935
 Mosul–Haifa oil pipeline commissioned.
 Armon Cinema opens.
 1937 – Orah Cinema in business (approximate date).
 1938 – British Government Hospital established.
 1939 – Oil refinery built.
 1941 – Shabtai Levy becomes mayor.
 1944 – Al-Ittihad newspaper begins publication.
 1947 – Population: 145,140.
 1948
 April: Battle of Haifa (1948).
 Haifa becomes part of the State of Israel.
 1950 – New Haifa Symphony Orchestra established.
 1951
 Haifa Museum of Art established.
 Abba Hushi becomes mayor.
 Al-Jadid literary journal begins publication.
 1953 – Gordon College of Education established.
 1955 – Kiryat Eliezer Stadium opens.
 1959 – Haifa Underground Funicular Railway begins operating.
 1960 – Tikotin Museum of Japanese Art opens on Mt. Carmel.
 1961
 Haifa Theatre founded.
 Population: 183,021.
 1963 – University of Haifa established.
 1969
 Technion's Rappaport Faculty of Medicine established.
 Moshe Flimann becomes mayor.
 Clandestine Immigration and Naval Museum opens.
 1971 – WIZO Haifa Academy of Design and Education established.
 1972
 IBM Haifa Research Laboratory established.
 Israeli National Maritime Museum opens.
 1973 – Sister city relationship established with San Francisco, USA.
 1974
 Matam hi-tech area developed.
 Yosef Almogi becomes mayor.
 1975
 Haifa Cinematheque established.
 Yeruham Zeisel becomes mayor.
 1976 – Romema Arena opens.
 1978 – Aryeh Gur'el becomes mayor.
 1983
 Haifa International Film Festival begins.
 Israel Railway Museum opens.
 Population: 225,775.
 1984 – Hecht Museum established.
 1989 – September: Mount Carmel forest fire (1989).
 1991 – Lev HaMifratz Mall in business.
 1993 – Amram Mitzna becomes mayor.
 1999 – Grand Canyon (mall) and Carmel Beach Railway Station open.

21st century

 2001 – Hutzot HaMifratz Railway Station and Lev HaMifratz Railway Station open.
 2002
 Sail Tower built.
 Haifa Bay Central Bus Station opens.
 2003
 Yona Yahav becomes mayor.
 IEC Tower built.
 Carmel Beach Central Bus Station opens.
 2004 – Almadina newspaper begins publication.
 2006 – 13 July: Haifa bombarded by Lebanese Hezbollah forces.
 2008 – Bahá'í World Centre designated an UNESCO World Heritage Site.
 2010
 December: Mount Carmel forest fire (2010).
 Carmel Tunnels open.
 2011 – Wikimania 2011 held in Haifa.
 2012 – Israeli Personal Computer Museum opens.
 2013 – Population: 272,181.
 2014 – Sammy Ofer Stadium opens.
 2016 – November 2016 Israel wildfires

See also
 History of Haifa
 Timelines of other cities in Israel: Tel Aviv (+ Jaffa)
 Timeline of Jerusalem

References

This article incorporates information from the Hebrew Wikipedia.

Bibliography

External links

 Map of Haifa (1958), via the University of Texas
 Items related to Haifa (various dates), via Europeana
 Items related to Haifa (various dates), via the Digital Public Library of America

 Haifa
Timeline
Haifa
Haifa-related lists
Haifa